Kęstutis Navickas (born January 13, 1984) is a badminton player from Lithuania. He competed at the 2008 Olympic Games in Beijing, China. Navickas was the bronze medalist at the 2015 Baku European Games in the men's singles event.  Currently Navickas serves as Head of Coaches Council in Lithuanian Badminton Federation.

Kestutis Navickas played in the German club TV Refrath from 2005-2006 after that he change to the team of Gifhon.

He won the Lithuanian National Badminton Championships in 2004, 2005, 2007 and 2008. He competed at the 2006 IBF World Championships and lost in the second round against Taufik Hidayat.

Achievements

European Games 
Men's singles

BWF International Challenge/Series 
Men's singles

Mixed doubles

  BWF International Challenge tournament
  BWF International Series tournament
  BWF Future Series tournament

References

External links 
 

1984 births
Living people
Sportspeople from Kaunas
Lithuanian male badminton players
Badminton players at the 2008 Summer Olympics
Olympic badminton players of Lithuania
Badminton players at the 2015 European Games
European Games bronze medalists for Lithuania
European Games medalists in badminton
Lithuanian badminton coaches